Timothy Gavin McIntosh (born 4 December 1979) is a New Zealand former international cricketer who played for the Auckland cricket team. He had one unsuccessful season for the Canterbury cricket team averaging only 4.90. 

He was born in Auckland. He has also played for Scottish side, Greenock for season 2007–2008 performing admirably with five centuries.

International career
On his New Zealand debut, it took McIntosh 38 deliveries to score his first runs in Tests. However, he impressed in his second Test, scoring a patient 136, his maiden Test century, to help New Zealand secure a draw against the West Indies. 

The 2010 tour of India started disastrously for McIntosh, when he scored a pair in the first Test at Ahmedabad. However, he bounced back and scored a patient 102 in the next Test at Hyderabad, becoming only the 11th batsman in the game to score a century after getting a pair in the previous match.

References

External links

1979 births
Living people
New Zealand cricketers
New Zealand Test cricketers
Auckland cricketers
Canterbury cricketers